The Bruche is a river in Alsace, in north-eastern France. It is a left-side tributary of the Ill, and part of the Rhine basin. It is 76.7 km long, and has a drainage basin of 
720 km2. Its source is in the Vosges, at the western foot of the mountain Climont, near the village of Bourg-Bruche. It flows through the towns Schirmeck, Mutzig, Molsheim and Holtzheim. It flows into the Ill in the city of Strasbourg, southwest of the historic centre. Its largest tributary is the river Mossig.

At Wolxheim, where the Bruche and Mossig meet, part of the water feeds the Canal de la Bruche, built in 1682 to link the sandstone quarries at Soultz-les-Bains with Strasbourg. The canal remained in use until 1939.

References

Bruche
Rivers of Grand Est
Rivers of Bas-Rhin